Dmitri Shostakovich's String Quartet No. 12 in D-flat major, Op. 133, was composed in 1968. It is dedicated to Dmitri Tsyganov, the first violinist of the Beethoven Quartet, which premiered the work in Moscow on June 14.

Structure

The work lasts approximately 26 minutes and is in two movements:

The piece contains twelve-tone elements, such as the opening in the cello:

References
Notes

Sources

External links
 
 
 
  
 

12
1968 compositions
Compositions in D-flat major